Marion Try Slaughter (April 6, 1883 – September 14, 1948), better known by his stage name Vernon Dalhart, was an American country music singer and songwriter. His recording of the classic ballad "Wreck of the Old 97" was the first country song reputed to have sold one million copies, although sales figures for pre-World War Two recordings are difficult to verify.

Biography
Dalhart was born in Jefferson, Texas, on April 6, 1883. He took his stage name from two towns, Vernon and Dalhart in Texas, between which he punched cattle as a teenager in the 1890s. Dalhart's father, Robert Marion Slaughter, was killed by his brother-in-law, Bob Castleberry, when Vernon was age 10. When Dalhart was 12 or 13, the family moved from Jefferson to Dallas, Texas.

He sang and played harmonica and Jew's harp at local community events and attended the Dallas Conservatory of Music. He married Sadie Lee Moore-Livingston in 1901 and had two children, a son and a daughter. In 1910, he moved the family to New York City, where he worked in a piano warehouse and took occasional singing jobs.

Music career
Dalhart's education was rooted in classical music. He wanted to be an opera singer, and in 1913 he got parts in Madame Butterfly and H.M.S. Pinafore. He saw an advertisement in the local newspaper for singers and applied. He was auditioned by Thomas Alva Edison and went on to record for Edison Records. From 1916 until 1923, he made over 400 recordings of light classical music and early dance band vocals for various record labels.

In the 1920s and 1930s, he sang on more than 5000 singles (78s) for many labels, employing more than 100 pseudonyms, such as Al Craver, Vernon Dale, Frank Evans, Hugh Lattimer, Sid Turner, George White (with original Memphis Five) and Bob White. On Grey Gull Records, he often used the name "Vel Veteran", which was also used by other singers, including Arthur Fields. He was already an established singer when he made his first country music recordings.

Dalhart stated in a 1918 interview amidst criticism of his accent seeming artificial, "When you are born and brought up in the South your only trouble is to talk any other way ...the 'sure 'nough Southerner' talks almost like a Negro, even when he's white. I've broken myself of the habit, more or less, in ordinary conversation, but it still comes pretty easy."

Hits
Dalhart had a hit single with his 1924 recording of "The Wreck of the Old 97", a classic American ballad about the derailment of Fast Mail train No. 97 near Danville, Virginia, in 1903. Recorded for the Victor Talking Machine Company, the song alerted the national record companies to the existence of a sizable market for country-music vocals. It became the first Southern song to become a national success. With "The Prisoner's Song" as the b-side, the single eventually sold as many as seven million copies, a huge number for recording in the 1920s. It was awarded a gold disc by the Recording Industry Association of America (RIAA) and was the biggest-selling, non-holiday record in the first 70 years of recorded music. Joel Whitburn, a statistician for Billboard magazine, determined that "The Prisoner's Song" was No. 1 hit for twelve weeks in 1925–26.

One of the recordings most associated with Vernon Dalhart, especially in the United Kingdom, is his 1925 track "The Runaway Train" (Talking Machine Co., Camden, New Jersey, Victor 19685-A, Shellac).  This was played on BBC Radio's 'Children's Favourites' between 1954 and 1982, and even now almost every compilation of children's records in the UK includes this timeless favourite.

Wanting to repeat the success of the single, the Victor Company sent Ralph Peer to the southern mountains in 1927 to facilitate the Bristol Sessions. These sessions led to the discovery of singer Jimmie Rodgers and the Carter Family, after which Peer's royalty model would become the standard of the music industry.

Death 
Dalhart died in Bridgeport, Connecticut, on September 14, 1948.

Discography 
Albums

Awards and honors
 Nashville Songwriters Hall of Fame, 1970
 Country Music Hall of Fame, 1981
 Grammy Hall of Fame Award, "The Prisoner's Song", 1998
 Gennett Records Walk of Fame, 2007
 Songs of the Century, "The Prisoner's Song"
 Grammy Hall of Fame Award, "Wreck Of The Old 97", 2021

References

External links

 Partial discography
 Vernon Dalhart, Victor Library
 Dalhart in the Country Music Hall of Fame
Vernon Dalhart cylinder recordings, from the UCSB Cylinder Audio Archive at the University of California, Santa Barbara Library.
 Vernon Dalhart recordings at the Discography of American Historical Recordings.
 Vernon Dalhart: from opera to country recordings - by Jack Palmer on Thomas Edison's Attic radio program, WFMU, February 7, 2006.
 About The Artist, Vernon Dalhart, By Jack Palmer, from Hillbilly Music Dawt Com.

1883 births
1948 deaths
American male singer-songwriters
American male pop singers
American country singer-songwriters
Country Music Hall of Fame inductees
People from Jefferson, Texas
People from Dallas
Gennett Records artists
Vocalion Records artists
Burials at Mountain Grove Cemetery, Bridgeport
RCA Victor artists
Edison Records artists
Columbia Records artists
Old-time musicians
Singer-songwriters from Texas
20th-century American singers
Country musicians from Texas
20th-century American male singers